Tiraque Municipality is the first municipal section of the Tiraque Province in the Cochabamba Department, Bolivia. At the time of census 2001 - still including Shinahota Canton (now Shinahota Municipality) - it had a population of 35,017. Its seat is Tiraque.

Cantons 
The municipality is divided into two cantons. They are (their seats in parentheses):
 Palca Canton - (Palca)
 Tiraque Canton - (Tiraque)

In 2009 Shinahota Canton (also named Central Busch Canton) got the status of a municipality.  Now Shinahota Municipality with its seat Shinahota is the second municipal section of the Tiraque Province.

See also 
 Jatun Mayu
 Pila Qucha
 Sayt'u Qucha
 T'utura Qucha
 Wasa Mayu

References 

 Instituto Nacional de Estadistica de Bolivia

Municipalities of the Cochabamba Department